The following is a list of British television related events from the year 2006.

Events

January

February

March

April

May

June

July

August

September

October

November

December

Debuts

BBC One

BBC Two

BBC Three

BBC Four

ITV (1/2/3/4/CITV)

Channel 4

Five

Disney Channel UK

Cartoon Network UK

Playhouse Disney UK

Channels

New channels

Defunct channels

Rebranded channels

Changes of network affiliation

Television shows

Returning this year after a break of one year or longer

Continuing television shows

1920s
BBC Wimbledon (1927–1939, 1946–2019, 2021–present)

1930s
The Boat Race (1938–1939, 1946–2019)

1950s
Panorama (1953–present)
What the Papers Say  (1956–2008)
The Sky at Night (1957–present)
Blue Peter  (1958–present)
Grandstand  (1958–2007)

1960s
Coronation Street  (1960–present)
Songs of Praise (1961–present)
Doctor Who (1963–1989, 1996, 2005–present)
Top of the Pops (1964–2006)
Match of the Day (1964–present)
The Money Programme  (1966–2010)

1970s
Emmerdale (1972–present)
Newsround (1972–present)
Last of the Summer Wine (1973–2010)
Arena  (1975–present)
One Man and His Dog (1976–present)
Grange Hill  (1978–2008)
Ski Sunday (1978–present)
Antiques Roadshow  (1979–present)
Question Time (1979–present)

1980s
Children in Need (1980–present)
Postman Pat (1981, 1991, 1994, 1996, 2004–2008)
Timewatch (1982–present)
Countdown (1982–present)
The Bill  (1984–2010)
Channel 4 Racing (1984–2016)
Thomas & Friends (1984–present)
EastEnders  (1985–present)
Comic Relief  (1985–present)
Casualty  (1986–present)
ChuckleVision  (1987–2009)
Fireman Sam (1987–1994, 2005–2013)
This Morning (1988–present)
The Simpsons (1989–present)

1990s
Have I Got News for You  (1990–present)
Room 101 (1994–2007, 2012–2018) 
A Touch of Frost (1992–2010)
Heartbeat (1992–2010)
Time Team (1994–2013)
The National Lottery Draws (1994–2017)
Top of the Pops 2 (1994–2017)
Hollyoaks  (1995–present)
Arthur (1996–present)
Never Mind the Buzzcocks (1996–2015)
Silent Witness (1996–present)
King of the Hill (1997–2010)
Midsomer Murders (1997–present)
South Park (1997–present)
Who Wants to Be a Millionaire? (1998–2014)
Bob the Builder (1998–present).
Bremner, Bird and Fortune (1999–2010)
Family Guy (1999–2002, 2005–present)
SpongeBob SquarePants (1999–present)
Holby City (1999–2022)

2000s
The Weakest Link (2000–2012, 2017–present)
Popworld (2001–2007)
Real Crime (2001–2011)
Flog It! (2002–2020)
Foyle's War (2002–2015)
I'm a Celebrity...Get Me Out of Here! (2002–present)
Harry Hill's TV Burp (2002–2012)
Spooks (2002–2011)
Top Gear (2002–present)
Daily Politics (2003–present)
New Tricks (2003–2015)
Peep Show (2003–2015)
All Grown Up! (2003–2008)
Tiny Pop (2003–2008)
Politics Show (2003–2011)
QI (2003–present)
The Royal (2003–2011)
PointlessBlog (2003-2007)
This Week (2003–2019)
Strictly Come Dancing (2004–present)
Sea of Souls (2004–2007)
Supernanny (2004–2008, 2010–2012)
Shameless (2004–2013)
Doc Martin (2004–2019)
The X Factor (2004–2018)
More4 News (2005—2009)
Love Soup (2005–2008)
Come Dine with Me (2005–present)
The Jeremy Kyle Show (2005–2019)
It's Me or the Dog (2005–2012)
Deal or No Deal (2005–2016)
Sunday AM (2005–2021)

Ending this year

Deaths

See also
 2006 in British music
 2006 in British radio
 2006 in the United Kingdom
 List of British films of 2006

References